Charles Hayden Buckley (born March 1, 1996) is an American professional golfer on the PGA Tour. He won the 2019 ATB Financial Classic on the PGA Tour Canada and the 2021 LECOM Suncoast Classic on the Korn Ferry Tour.

College career
Buckley went to high school in Tupelo, Mississippi. Despite not being heavily recruited in high school, Buckley signed with the University of Missouri where he enjoyed four college wins. By his senior year, he was a first-team All-Southeastern Conference selection, a third-team All-American, and named the Missouri Male Athlete of the Year for the 2017–18 season.

Professional career
Buckley turned professional in 2018. In the 2019 season, he played in all 12 PGA Tour Canada events, making 11 cuts and registering six top-10 finishes. Buckley claimed his first career Mackenzie Tour victory at the ATB Financial Classic and a sixth-place finish on the Order of Merit to earn Korn Ferry Tour membership.

In February 2021, Buckley earned his first Korn Ferry Tour title in his 17th career start with a birdie on the first playoff hole at the LECOM Suncoast Classic.

Professional wins (2)

Korn Ferry Tour wins (1)

Korn Ferry Tour playoff record (1–0)

PGA Tour Canada wins (1)

Results in major championships

CUT = missed the half-way cut

Results in The Players Championship

CUT = missed the halfway cut
"T" indicates a tie for a place

See also
2021 Korn Ferry Tour Finals graduates

References

External links

American male golfers
PGA Tour golfers
Missouri Tigers men's golfers
Golfers from Tennessee
Golfers from Florida
Sportspeople from Chattanooga, Tennessee
Sportspeople from Naples, Florida
1996 births
Living people